Édouard Montoute (born 20 December 1970) is a French actor.

Filmography

Film 
 1990: Jean Galmot, aventurier by Alain Maline 
 1991: Paris s'éveille by Olivier Assayas: un dealer
 1995: La Haine by Mathieu Kassovitz: Darty
 1995: Fast by Dante Desarthe: Daniel
 1997: Port Djema by Éric Heumann: Ousman
 1997: Mauvais Genre by Laurent Bénégui: François
 1997: Bouge ! by Jérôme Cornuau: Soso
 1997: J'irai au paradis car l'enfer est ici by Xavier Durringer: Pascal
 1998: Taxi by Gérard Pirès: Alain
 1998: La voie est libre by Stéphane Clavier: Yves
 1999: Le Sourire du clown by Éric Besnard: Alex
 1999: Du bleu jusqu'en Amérique by Sarah Lévy : Hamid
 2000: Taxi 2 by Gérard Krawczyk: Alain
 2000: Cours toujours by Dante Desarthe: Hervé
 2000: Antilles sur Seine by Pascal Légitimus: Freddy
 2001: Les gens en maillot de bain ne sont pas (forcément) superficiels by Éric Assous: Lulu
 2002: Femme fatale by Brian De Palma: Racine
 2002: Astérix et Obélix: Mission Cléopâtre by Alain Chabat: Nexusis
 2002: La Sirène rouge by Olivier Megaton: Oliveira
 2003: Taxi 3 by Gérard Krawczyk: Alain
 2003: Dédales by René Manzor: Ray
 2004: Nos amis les flics by Bob Swaim: Kiki
 2005: Dans tes rêves by Denis Thybaud: Keuj
 2005: Avant qu'il ne soit trop tard by Laurent Dussaux: Gérard
 2006: Enfermés dehors by Albert Dupontel: le chauffeur de bus
 2007: Fracassés by Franck Llopis: Jean-Paul
 2007: Taxi 4 by Gérard Krawczyk: Alain
 2008: Jamais 2 sans 3 by Eric Summer: Étienne Garreau
 2008: La Première Étoile by Lucien Jean-Baptiste: Jojo
 2009: Trésor by Claude Berri et François Dupeyron
 2010: Les Petits Mouchoirs by Guillaume Canet: l'ami de Ludo au Baron
 2012: 30° Couleur by Lucien Jean-Baptiste: Zamba
 2016: Dieumerci ! by Lucien Jean-Baptiste: The Chief
 2018: Taxi 5 by : Alain

Short films 
 1993: Zone bleue de Catherine Morlat
 1995: Petit matin sanglant de Julien Corain
 1997: À fond la caisse de Vincent Rivier: le braqueur
 2000: Mortels by Samuel Jouy: Eddy
 2002: Alex & Bladas by Marc Barrat, Série de 5 courts-métrages de fiction (6') contre le sida en Guyane, commandités par le Ministère de la santé: Alex
 2005: Convivium de Michaël Nakache: Hugo

Television 
 1991: Navarro de Nicolas Ribowski (episode Les chasse-neige): Soulimane
 1992: Momo by Jean-Louis Bertuccelli: Koffi
 1992: Goal: Keita
 1994: 3000 scénarios contre un virus by Xavier Durringer (episode Le flic)
 1994: Mort d'un gardien de la paix by Josée Dayan
 1994: Novacek by Marco Pico (episode Le Croisé de l'Ordre)
 1995: Police des polices by Michel Boisrond (episode L'Ilotier)
 1995: Navarro de Nicolas Ribowski (episode Le choix de Navarro)
 1999: Chambre n° 13 by Sarah Lévy (episode Coccinelle)
 2000: Les Redoutables by Sarah Lévy (episode Prime Time)
 2000: Mary Lester de Christiane Leherissey (episode Maéna)
 2001: Accro de Olivier Pancho
 2002: Duelles de Laurence Katrian (episode Trahisons)
 2002: Carnets d'ado – Les paradis de Laura de Olivier Panchot
 2002: Sang d'encre by Didier Le Pêcheur
 2004: Central Nuit de Franck Vestiel (episode Vol à la Poussette)
 2004: Un petit garçon silencieux by Sarah Lévy
 2004: Les amants du bagne by Thierry Binisti
 2005: Léa Parker by Robin Davis (episode Combat Clandestin)
 2006: Alice et Charlie (1er episod) de Stéphane Clavier
 2006: Au crépuscule des temps by Sarah Lévy
 2006: David Nolande by Nicolas Cuche
 2007: Alice et Charlie (2e episod) de Julien Seri
 2008: Flics (serial) de Olivier Marchal: Alex Baros 
 2008: Scalp by Xavier Durringer (serial): Ziggy
 2009–2011: Les Toqués (serial) de Patrick Malakian: Martin Soléno
 2009: Jamais deux sans trois (téléfilm) de Eric Summer:  Etienne Garreau
 2009: Facteur chance (téléfilm) de Julien Seri: Miko
 2009: Les Amants de l'ombre (téléfilm) de Philippe Niang: Sidney Jackson
 2009: Lady Bar 2 (téléfilm) de Xavier Durringer : Aimé
 2010: Le Pot de colle (téléfilm) de Julien Seri: Jean-Bernard Hollier
 2010: Les Edelweiss (serial)de Stéphane Kappes: Bernard
 2012: Des soucis et des hommes  (serial) de Christophe Barraud: Hervé Le Bihan
 2013: La Croisière (serie) de Pascal Lahmani, avec Lola Dewaere, Anne-Élisabeth Blateau et Christophe Malavoy
 2013: La Source (serie) de Xavier Durringer
 2014: Caïn (2 episodes) de Bertrand Arthuys

External links
 

Living people
20th-century French male actors
1970 births
21st-century French male actors
French male film actors
French male television actors
People from Cayenne
Taxi (film series)